Events in the year 1900 in Costa Rica.

Incumbents
President: Rafael Yglesias Castro

Events

Births
January 10 - Teodoro Picado Michalski, President 1944-1948 (d. 1960)

Deaths

References

1900s in Costa Rica
Years of the 20th century in Costa Rica
Costa Rica
Costa Rican